Otilino George Tenorio Bastidas (1 February 1980 – 7 May 2005) was an Ecuadorian footballer who played as a forward.

Club career
Tenorio was born in Guayaquil, Ecuador. His nickname was 'Spiderman', because when he scored a goal in a football match he would cover his head with a Spider-Man mask as he celebrated.

He joined Emelec of Guayaquil when he was eleven, and went on to play for the club at a professional level. He was noted for his good finishing ability and his flamboyant mask celebration was enjoyed by many. In 2004, he moved to Saudi Arabian club Al-Nasr, where he had trouble settling and eventually moved back to Ecuador to play for El Nacional of Quito.

International career
He was first selected for the Ecuador national team in 2004; however he did not play any matches that year due to an injury. By 2005, he had recovered and made some impressive displays both for his club and country.

Death
Tenorio died in May, 2005 due to an automobile accident suffered when he was travelling to Quevedo, to visit his family. The accident happened three days after he played for his country in a 1–0 win over Paraguay, which was a friendly match played in New York City. The car in which he was travelling collided with a gas truck on the Santo Domingo-Quevedo road. He was twenty-five.

As a homage to Tenorio during the 2006 World Cup, former teammate Iván Kaviedes pulled on a Yellow 'Spiderman' mask after scoring the third goal of Ecuador's triumphant 3–0 win over Costa Rica.

External links

FIFA report death

1980 births
2005 deaths
Sportspeople from Guayaquil
Association football forwards
Ecuadorian footballers
Ecuador international footballers
C.S. Emelec footballers
Al Nassr FC players
C.D. El Nacional footballers
Ecuadorian expatriate footballers
Expatriate footballers in Saudi Arabia
Road incident deaths in Ecuador
Saudi Professional League players